Grigori Naumovich Voitinsky, born Zarkhin (17 April 1893 – 11 June 1953) was a Soviet Comintern official. He was sent to China in 1920 as a senior advisor to contact the top prominent Chinese communists such as Chen Duxiu, just before the formation of the Communist Party of China. The process of forming the Communist Party can be mostly attributed to his influence, although his successor advisors had more influence about the official party line itself, such as allying with the Kuomintang.

He was born on 17 April 1893 in Nevel to a Russian Jewish family. In 1918, he joined the Bolshevik Party. He took an active part in the Far Eastern Front in the Russian Civil War.

Work in China 
In 1920, the Soviet Union established the Far Eastern Bureau in Siberia, a branch of the Third Communist International, or the Comintern. Thus he was directly responsible for managing the establishment of a Communist party in China and other far east countries. Soon after its establishment, the bureau's deputy manager Voitinsky arrived in Beijing and contacted the Communist vanguard Li Dazhao. Li arranged for Voitinsky to meet with another Communist leader, Chen Duxiu, in Shanghai. In August 1920, Voitinsky, Chen Duxiu, Li Hanjun, Shen Xuanlu, Yu Xiusong, Shi Cuntong, and others began to establish the Comintern China Branch.

The Shanghai Chronicle (not to be confused with the Shanghai Jewish Chronicle) was set up in 1919 in Shanghai by Shemeshko and other Russians with socialist leanings, and received financial aid from the Soviet Russian government in early 1920. In the spring of 1920, Voitinsky and his colleagues came to China on a mission to establish the Communist Party in China. They not only came to China in the guise of editors and reporters for the newspaper, but also set up the Comintern's East Asia Secretariat in the newspaper office. From then on, the Shanghai Chronicle became both a propaganda vehicle for the East Asia Secretariat and a cover for Bolshevik activity in China. Because the newspaper staff assisted Soviet Russian and Comintern personnel stationed under cover at the newspaper in activities to establish a communist organization in China, the newspaper as a whole played a special role in the early communist movement in China. Although the Shanghai Chronicle stopped publication at the end of 1922 because Russian aid came to an end, many staff members continued to work for Bolshevism.

Later career 
He worked as Comintern representative until 1926.  Then worked in the Siberian government in Irkutsk until 1929, when he moved to Moscow, where he worked in various Orientalist institutions.  In 1934 he became a professor in Moscow State University.

He is considered one of the founders of Soviet Sinology. He wrote several books about contemporary China politics.  He died in 1953 during an unsuccessful surgical operation.

References

1893 births
1956 deaths
Comintern people
Communist Party of the Soviet Union members
Delegates to the 5th National Congress of the Chinese Communist Party
Jewish socialists
Soviet Jews